Belören is a settlement in the Bayat District of Çorum Province in Turkey.

References

Bayat District, Çorum